Virtual crime or in-game crime refers to a virtual criminal act that takes place in a massively multiplayer online game (such as an MMORPG), or within the broader metaverse. The huge time and effort invested into such games can lead online "crime" to spill over into real world crime, and even blur the distinctions between the two. Some countries have introduced special police investigation units to cover such "virtual crimes". South Korea is one such country and looked into 22,000 cases in the first six months of 2003.

Notable virtual crimes occurred in 2021 on the Horizon Worlds platform, leading to a renewed conversation about safety in the metaverse.

Meaning
Several interpretations of the term "virtual crime" exist. Some legal scholars opt for a definition based on a report written by freelance journalist Julian Dibbell on what was the first prominent case, "a rape in cyberspace." One such scholar defined virtual crime as needing to have all the qualities of a real crime, and so was not a new subset of crime at all. Conversely, it has also been said that the connection between virtual crimes and real crimes are "tenuous at best: It is the link between a brutal rape and a fictional story of a brutal rape. Surely the difference is more striking than any similarity." It is difficult to prove that there are real-life implications of virtual crime, so it is not widely accepted as prosecutable.

To rectify this, the modern interpretation of the term "virtual" must be amended such that it carries the traditional implication; "that is such in essence or effect, though not recognised as such in name or according to strict definition." In this sense, it "would include those crimes that somehow evoke and approach the effect and essence of real crime, but are not considered crimes."

Virtual economies

Over time, players build their characters and collect in-game items. Some such items may have been obtained through months of gameplay, involving various tasks and a substantial level of effort. According to standard conceptions of economic value, the goods and services of virtual economies do have a demonstrable value. Since players of these games are willing to substitute real economic resources of time and money (monthly fees) in exchange for these resources, by definition they have demonstrated utility to the user.

Stemming from their value in the virtual economy, these items, and the characters themselves, have gained monetary value in the real world. eBay, along with specialist trading sites, have allowed players to sell their wares. This has attracted fraudulent sales as well as theft.  Many game developers, such as Blizzard Entertainment (responsible for World of Warcraft) oppose and even prohibit the practice. Some argue that to allow in-game items to have monetary values makes these games, essentially, gambling venues.

In the online world of Brittania, the currency of one Annum equates to about $3.4 US. If someone were to steal another player's virtual currency, they could convert it to US dollars via PayPal. This stems controversy over whether or not this should be dealt with like real crime, as there are real-life implications.

In most games, players do not own, materially or intellectually, any part of the game world, and merely pay to use it. Because this "virtual property" is actually owned by the game developer, a developer who opposed real commerce of in-game currencies would have the right to destroy virtual goods as soon as they were listed on eBay or otherwise offered for real trade.

Known cases

In South Korea, where the number of computer game players is massive, some have reported the emergence of gangs and mafia, where powerful players steal and demand that beginners give them virtual money for their "protection".

In China, Qiu Chengwei was sentenced to life in prison after stabbing and killing fellow The Legend of Mir 3 gamer Zhu Caoyuan.  In the game Qiu had lent Zhu a powerful sword (a "dragon sabre"), which Zhu then went on to sell on eBay for 7,200 Yuan (about £473 or US$870). With no Chinese laws covering the online dispute, there was nothing the police could do.

In the game The Sims Online a 17-year-old boy going by the in-game name "Evangeline", was discovered in 2005 to have built a cyber-brothel, where customers would pay sim-money for minutes of cybersex. This led to the cancellation of his accounts but no legal action, mainly because he was above the age of consent.

The term "virtual mugging" was coined when some players of Lineage II used bots to defeat other player's characters and take their items. In Japan, the Kagawa prefectural police arrested a Chinese foreign exchange student on 16 August 2005 following the reports of virtual mugging and the online sale of the stolen items.

The virtual economies of many MMOs and the exchange of virtual items and currency for real money has triggered the birth of the game sweatshop, in which workers in the developing world, typically China (although there has been reports of this type of activity in Eastern European countries), earn real-world wages for long days spent monotonously performing in-game tasks. Most instances typically involve farming of resources or currency, which has given rise to the epithet Chinese Adena Farmer, because of its first reported widespread use in Lineage II. More egregious cases involve using exploits such as in duping money or items, such as a large-scale incident in Star Wars Galaxies. Both practices can place great stress on the creators' artificial economy, requiring robust design, and often repeated updates, to preserve reasonable work/reward ratios and game balance. There have also been reports of collusion (or vertical integration, depending on the source) among farmers and online currency exchanges. In 2002, a company called Blacksnow Interactive, a game currency exchange, admitted to using workers in a "virtual sweatshop" in Tijuana, Mexico to farm money and items from Ultima Online and Dark Age of Camelot. When Mythic Entertainment cracked down on the practice, Blacksnow attempted to sue the game company.

It was reported on 14 November 2007 that a Dutch teenager had been arrested for allegedly stealing virtual furniture from "rooms" in 3D social-networking website Habbo Hotel. The teenagers involved were accused of creating fake Habbo websites in order to lure users into entering their account details, which would then be used to steal virtual furniture bought with real money totalling €4000.

In July 2018 a mother in the United States posted on Facebook that her daughter's avatar on Roblox had been gang raped by two other users. Roblox later responded stating that they were outraged that a "bad actor" had violated its community policies and rules of conduct, and that they had zero tolerance over the user behavior shown during the incident. The incident led to The Village Voice reprinting A Rape in Cyberspace.

In July 2021 a formally convicted sex offender was arrested in Illinois for allegedly grooming and solicitating a minor through the use of Roblox.

On 26 November 2021, a beta user of Horizon Worlds reported being groped in-game, and that other users supported the conduct. Meta responded that there are built-in tools to block interactions with other users, which are not enabled by default, and that although the incident was "absolutely unfortunate" it would provide good feedback because they "want to make [the blocking feature] trivially easy and findable."

In December 2021, metaverse researcher and psychotherapist Nina Jane Patel reported that her avatar was gang-raped within 60 seconds of joining Meta's Horizon Worlds platform. Elena Martellozzo, an associate professor of criminology at Middlesex University says that a disinhibition process occurs on-line, due to the lack of face-to-face interaction, and that the metaverse "enhances this disinhibition process even more greatly."

See also

 Social media and suicide
 Griefing
 Kill stealing

References

External references 

Thomas-Gabriel Rüdiger: Sex offenders in the virtual worlds. Brandenburg 2013
Thomas-Gabriel Rüdiger: The Real World of Sexual Predators and Online Gaming . Be a kids hero, 2015  
Susan W. Brenner. Is There Such a Thing as "Virtual Crime"? 4 Cal. Crim. Law Rev. 1  
7 July 2005. "Wage Slaves" at 1up.com. Retrieved 19 August 2005
7 February 2005. "Virtual worlds wind up in real world's courts at MSNBC. Retrieved 19 August 2005
Lastowka, Greg and Hunter, Dan. "Virtual Crimes" New York Law School Law Review.
Diana Selck, Thomas-Gabriel Rüdiger: Online games as risk generators for children and adolescents – Analysing risk factors in gaming environments criminologia, 2016

External links
"Is There Such a Thing as 'Virtual Crime'?" at California Criminal Law Review
"People are earning real dollars selling imaginary items in online games – and rewriting the law in the process"
"'Voleur' means "thief", Part 1", at the "Alphaville Herald"

Crime by type
Emergent gameplay
Virtual economy